James, Jim or Jimmy Phillips may refer to:

Arts and entertainment
 James Madhlope Phillips (1919–1987), South African artist
 John Turner (lyricist) (James John Turner Phillips, born 1932), English songwriter
 Jim Phillips (graphic artist) (born 1944), American graphic designer and cartoonist, art director for Santa Cruz Skateboards
 James Phillips (South African musician) (1959–1995), South African rock singer, songwriter and performer
 James Phillips (playwright) (born 1977), British playwright and director
 LRoc (James Elbert Phillips, (fl. 1995–present), American songwriter and producer
 James Phillips (Canadian musician), Canadian multi-instrumentalist, producer and engineer

Politics and law
 James Phillips (MP) (1672–1730), Welsh politician
 James Robert Phillips (1864–1897), British colonial administrator
 Jimmy Phillips (politician) (1913–2002), American politician, Texas state senator
 James Dickson Phillips Jr. (1922–2017), American judge
 Jim Phillips Sr. (1931–2018), American politician, North Carolina state senator
 James T. Phillips (1953–2014), American politician, New Jersey state senator

Sports

Association football (soccer)
 James Phillips (footballer) (fl. 1877–1878), Scottish international football player
 Jimmy Phillips (footballer, born 1966), English football player (Bolton Wanderers)
 Jimmy Phillips (footballer, born 1989), English football player (Gateshead)

Cricket
 James Phillips (English cricketer) (1849–1905), English cricketer
 Jim Phillips (cricketer) (1860–1930), Australian cricketer
 James Phillips (South African cricketer) (born 1963), South African cricketer

Other sports
 Jim Phillips (American football) (1936–2015), American football wide receiver
 James Phillips (kickboxer) (born 1980), German-American kickboxer and martial artist
 James Phillips (rugby union) (born 1987), English rugby union player
 James J. Phillips (fl. 2004–present), American college athletic administrator

Others
 James Liddell Phillips (1840–1895), Indian medical and religious missionary
 James Milner Phillips (1905–1974), English engineer and businessman
 James F. Phillips (1930–2001), American environmental activist who worked under the pseudonym the Fox
 James Charles Phillips (born 1933), American physicist
 James Andrew Phillips, Australian philosopher

See also
 James Philipps (1594–1675), Welsh politician